Coleophora microspinella is a moth of the family Coleophoridae. It is found by Reznik in 1981 in Turkmenistan.

The larvae feed on Artemisia species, including Artemisia turanica, Artemisia badhysi and Artemisia kopetdaghensis. They feed on the leaves of their host plant.

References

microspinella
Moths described in 1981
Moths of Asia